James Neilson Pettigrew (born 28 July 1958) who is currently the chairman of the AIB Group Plc, BlueBay Asset Management, Scottish Ballet, Dundee Heritage Trust. Until recently, he was the chairman of Virgin Money & CYBG PLC, the owners of Clydesdale Bank, Yorkshire Bank and the digital app based current account provider, B.  CYBG PLC was formed as part of the demerger with National Australia Bank in early 2016. From 2016-2019, he was Chairman of Scottish Financial Enterprise (SFE), the representative body for Scotland's financial services industry, from 2016-2019. He was also co-chair for the Financial Services Advisory Board (FiSAB) with the First Minister, and was on the advisory board of TheCityUK.

Early life 
Pettigrew was born in Dundee, Scotland in 1958. He attended the High School of Dundee between 1964 - 1976, before going on to study Law at the University of Aberdeen where he gained a L.L.B in 1979. He then undertook a post graduate Accountancy qualification at the University of Glasgow obtaining his Dip.Acc in 1980. He went on to qualify as a CA with Ernst and Young before moving into the corporate sector.

Career history 
In 1988, Pettigrew joined Sedgwick Group plc, a member of the FTSE 100, rising to become Group Treasurer and stayed until December 1998 at which point he was Deputy Group CFO.

In January 1999, he joined ICAP plc which became a FTSE 100 company and the world’s largest specialist inter-dealer broker, as Group Finance Director.

He was Chief Operating and Financial Officer of Ashmore Group plc from 2006 to 2007 where he played an important role supporting the IPO initiative and managing the post IPO process both internally and externally. 

Pettigrew then became Chief Executive Officer of CMC Markets plc in October 2007 having previously served as a Non-Executive Director.

He is also a former president of ICAS.

Since leaving CMC Markets plc in 2009, Pettigrew has been building a portfolio of non-executive director appointments; with a focus on the Financial Services and Insurance sectors. He is currently serving on the below boards:
 Chairman of AIB Group Plc.
Chairman of Scottish Ballet
 Chairman of BlueBay Asset Management (Services) Ltd and BlueBay Asset Management LLP (members of the RBC Group)
Chairman of Dundee Heritage Trust
He previously held positions on the boards of:
Chairman of Clydesdale Bank and CYBG PLC,
Chairman of Miton Group PLC
Chairman of Scottish Financial Enterprise
Co-Chair of the Financial Services Advisory Board
Interim Chairman and Senior Independent Non-Executive Director of Rathbone Brothers Plc
Aberdeen Asset Management plc (2010-2016)
 CMC Markets plc (2005-2007),
 Hermes (2009-2014),
 Aon UK Ltd (2011-2014),
 The Edinburgh Investment Trust PLC,
 Crest Nicholson Holdings PLC.
City UK Advisory Board

On 7 May 2018 it was reported that CYBG plc, under the leadership of David Duffy and the Board, had made an all share offer to acquire Virgin Money UK. On 18 June 2018 it was announced that the takeover had been agreed. Arrangements were made for CYBG to license the Virgin Money brand for £12 million a year (later rising to £15 million a year) and to move all its retail customers to Virgin Money over the following three years.

Outside interests 
Pettigrew has served on the Foundation Board helping preserve the world’s last sea-going paddle steamer – The Waverley.

References

External links 

 Official website

1958 births
Living people
People educated at the High School of Dundee
Alumni of the University of Aberdeen
Alumni of the University of Glasgow